Six by Seven (also written as SIX.BY SEVEN or six.by seven or six.byseven) are an English indie rock band, formed in 1992 in Nottingham. The classic lineup of the band featured singer/guitarist Chris Olley, guitarist Sam Hempton, drummer Chris Davis, bassist Paul Douglas and keyboard player James Flower. 

The band split up in 2008, before re-forming in 2012 with Olley and Flower as the only original members.

Formation
Originally formed in 1992 as "Friends Of...", they performed their first show at the Old Angel pub in their hometown of Nottingham in late 1992. After recording several demos and playing gigs, the band attracted some record company interest. However, they once played to a room full of A&R men at Leicester's Charlotte with the room emptying before the first 15-minute song was complete. Undeterred, the band continued to write and record. Bass player Paul Douglas joined later that year. The band got their break by playing support slots with Rocket from the Crypt and Girls Against Boys, and changed their name to Six by Seven in 1996. The name was taken from the research connected with the Hubble Space Telescope. Sam Hempton came up with the name and described it as follows:

"There was a big debate as to whether the millions of other galaxies in the universe were accelerating away from each other or moving away at a constant rate, or whether they were actually coming back in on themselves. The scientists originally thought that everything would eventually come back in on itself and implode, but what's actually happening is that they are accelerating away at a rate of 6 x 7."

Early releases
In 1997 the band released their debut 12-inch single 'European Me', which led to a five-album deal. Their debut album, The Things We Make, was released the following year, after which they began headlining their own shows, as well as touring with Ash, Manic Street Preachers, The Dandy Warhols, and Placebo. In May 1998, they were asked to play a live session on the John Peel Show, and recorded four more sessions over the next four years.

Their second album, The Closer You Get, was released in 2000. Sam Hempton left the band shortly thereafter. Douglas followed in 2002, after the release of their third album, The Way I Feel Today. In September 2004 the fourth album 04 was released, along with a collection of outtakes from the recording sessions called Left Luggage at the Peveril Hotel which was initially available through the band's website. In April 2005 a new album was announced for release entitled Artists Cannibals Poets Thieves – it was described as Six by Seven's "first album as a three-piece".

Disbanding
Shortly before the album's release in June, the band announced they were to "stop touring and effectively end the group for the foreseeable future", with a live album and a b-sides and rarities collection to follow.

In December 2005 a new "unofficial" studio album – Club Sandwich at the Peveril Hotel – was released on the band's web site on 16 January 2006, with a limited number of copies making their way into stores in March. Although there was mention (and even scheduling) of a series of live gigs for early 2006, these shows were eventually cancelled.

In August 2006 the band made a surprise appearance playing at the Social in Nottingham with a new line-up featuring past collaborators Tony Doggen Foster and Ady Fletcher with Ian Bissett newly recruited on the drums.

In September 2006 a collection of rarities, live tracks and demo recordings was made available via the bands' website.

On 12 December 2006 the band played another gig at the Social in Nottingham. Once again this featured the lineup of Chris Olley, James Flower, Doggen, Ady Fletcher and Ian Bissett.

Side projects
Chris Olley continues to work on solo project Twelve but has laid electro clash outfit Fuck Me USA to rest. He released his first solo album in November 2009 and has released several more since, mostly via his website.

Chis Davis formed Spotlight Kid as a side project with Nottingham-based singer Katty Heath in 2004. When Six by Seven broke up in 2005 Chris decided to carry on full-time with Spotlight Kid.  The second album featured Chris (as ringleader, chief songwriter and stickman) and a full band, along with Katty continuing on vocal duties.

Reformation
In February 2007, it was officially announced via the band's website that Six by Seven had re-formed with their original lineup of Chris Olley, Sam Hempton, James Flower and Christian Davis. Pete Stevenson takes over Paul Douglas' role on bass.

July 2007 saw the online release of a new album recorded solely by Olley and Flower. It was entitled If Symptoms Persist, Kill Your Doctor and was limited to 1000 copies only. Its lyrics are inspired by an episode of a BBC TV programme called The Trap. Gigs were scheduled to coincide with the release.

A best of (with songs chosen by fans on the official forum) was released later including remixes and a DVD containing the band's promo videos.

The band finally imploded after Chris Olley left in November 2008.

In August 2012, Chris Olley announced that he and James Flower re-formed Six by Seven and that they were recording new material with the former Placebo drummer Steve Hewitt.  A new album, Love And Peace And Sympathy, was released on 8 July 2013.

Following a Facebook campaign to get Eat Junk Become Junk to number one another re-formation happened. After the song went to number one in the Christmas 2015 Rock Download Chart, Beggars Banquet re-released the band's second album on vinyl, including a bonus album of B-sides and Peel Sessions. A Greatest Hits CD was also released. Following this the band did two one-off shows with the original line-up at the Maze In Nottingham and The Garage in London. At the Maze show in Nottingham the band played The Closer You Get album in its entirety.

With another six by seven show planned in October 2017, Chris Olley intends to re-form and restructure the band as a going live concern once again. The band played the Glade stage at Glastonbury Festival in 2019.

Discography

Studio albums
The Things We Make (1998)
The Closer You Get (2000)
The Way I Feel Today (2002) UK #69
04  (2004)
Artists Cannibals Poets Thieves (2005)
If Symptoms Persist, Kill Your Doctor (2007)
Love and Peace and Sympathy (2013)
The World Hates Me and the Feeling Is Mutual (2019)

VINYL ONLY 

six by seven I - also known as Blood Drips Album (2015)
six by seven II - also known as Hollywood Splatter Album (2016)
EXII (2017)

Compilations
Left Luggage at the Peveril Hotel (2004)
Club Sandwich at the Peveril Hotel (2006)
Any Colour So Long as It's Black (All the Way from Forest Fields and Back...) (2008)
 Greatest Hits (2016)

Singles and EPs
"European Me" (1997)
"88-92-96" (1997)
"Candlelight" (1998) UK #70
"For You" (1998)
"European Me ep" (1998)
"Two and a Half Days in Love with You EP" (1999)
"Ten Places to Die" (1999)
"New Year" (2000)
"Eat Junk Become Junk" (2000)
"So Close" (2002)
"I O U Love" (2002) UK #48
"All My New Best Friends" (2002)
"Bochum (Light Up My Life)" (2003)
"Bring Down the Government" (2003)
"Ready for You Now" (2004)
"Catch the Rain" (2004)
"Ocean/Clouds" (2004)

Live, demo, or unofficial albums
B-Sides & Rarities 1
B-Sides & Rarities 2
Live in Ashton-Under-Lyne 08/09/99
Live in Usa, Oslo, Newcastle
Live in Amsterdam/Paris
Live at La Route Du Rock 1998
Live at Eden project 11 August 2001
Live at Manchester Hop and Grape 15-04-02
Live at Nottingham Boatclub 31/10/02
Live Sessions 1999-2001
Alternative Versions, Remixes and Cover Versions
Demo's 1997-99
Live at the Peveril Hotel
Demos Volume II
Live at Glastonbury 2008

References

External links
 
Six by Seven interview (June 2000) for QRD
Six by Seven interview (September 2002) for QRD
Chris Olley (Twelve/Six by Seven) interview (May 2006) for QRD

English indie rock groups
Neo-psychedelia groups
British shoegaze musical groups
English space rock musical groups
Musical groups established in 1996
Musical groups disestablished in 2008
Musical groups disestablished in 2012
Musical groups from Nottingham